Copelatus debilis is a species of diving beetle. It is part of the genus Copelatus of the subfamily Copelatinae in the family Dytiscidae. It was described by Sharp in 1882.

References

debilis
Beetles described in 1882